Ig gamma-3 chain C region is a protein that in humans is encoded by the IGHG3 gene.

References

Further reading

Proteins